

Friedrich-Carl Cranz (14 November 1886 – 24 March 1941) was a German general during World War II who commanded  18th Infantry Division. He was a recipient of the Knight's Cross of the Iron Cross. Cranz was killed 24 March 1941 in a training accident by friendly artillery fire. He is buried in the Invalid's Cemetery in Berlin.

Awards and decorations

 Knight's Cross of the Iron Cross on 29 June 1940 as Generalleutnant and commander of 18. Infanterie-Division

References

Citations

Bibliography

 

1886 births
1941 deaths
People from Chełmno
People from West Prussia
Lieutenant generals of the German Army (Wehrmacht)
Recipients of the clasp to the Iron Cross, 1st class
Recipients of the Knight's Cross of the Iron Cross
Military personnel killed by friendly fire
Burials at the Invalids' Cemetery